This is a timeline documenting events of Jazz in the year 1928.

Musicians born that year included Cannonball Adderley, Etta Jones and Fats Domino.

Events
By 1928, jazz was becoming popular in Germany and was being taught in Frankfurt.

Standards

 In 1928 the standards "Basin Street Blues", "Sweet Lorraine" and "Mack the Knife" were published.

Deaths

 June
 24 – Jimmy O'Bryant, American jazz clarinetist (born 1896).

 August
 29 – Stump Evans, American jazz saxophonist (born 1904).

Births

 January
 3 – Al Belletto, American saxophonist and clarinetist (died 2014).
 4 – Alan Littlejohn, British trumpeter (died 1996).
 11 – Cal Massey, American trumpeter (died 1972).
 12 – Ruth Brown, American singer-songwriter and actress (died 2006).
 14 – Joe Muranyi, Hungarian-American clarinetist (died 2012).
 15 – Werner Dies, German tenor saxophonist, clarinetist, guitarist, composer, and arranger (died 2003).
 23 – Dave Black, American drummer (died 2006).
 24 – Mick Mulligan, English trumpeter and bandleader (died 2006).
 26 – Dick Nash, American trombonist.
 29 – Beverly Kenney, American singer (died 1960).
 31 – Keshav Sathe, Indian tabla player (died 2012).

 February
 6 – Nelson Boyd, American bassist (died 1985).
 11 – Conrad Janis, American trombonist and actor.
 18 – Frank Butler, American drummer (died 1984).
 25 – Mike Hennessey, English music journalist and pianist (died 2017).
 26 – Fats Domino, American pianist and singer-songwriter (died 2017).

 March
 5
 Lou Levy, American pianist (died 2001).
 Wilbur Little, African-American bassist (died 1987).
 9 – Keely Smith, American singer (died 2017).
 12
 Aldemaro Romero, Venezuelan pianist and composer (died 2007).
 Paul Kuhn, German pianist, singer, and band leader (died 2013).
 Willie Maiden, American saxophonist and arranger (died 1976).
 15 – Bob Wilber, American clarinetist and saxophonist (died 2019).
 31 – Archie Semple, Scottish clarinettist (died 1974).

 April
 3 – Bill Potts, American pianist (died 2005).
 4 – Alfredo "Chocolate" Armenteros, Cuban trumpeter (died 2016).
 6 – Eddie Hubble, American trombonist (died 2016).
 8 – Derek Hogg, English drummer.
 9 – Monty Sunshine, English clarinettist (died 2010).
 10
 Fraser MacPherson, Canadian saxophonist (died 1993).
 Jerzy Matuszkiewicz, Polish saxophonist and composer (died 2021).
 Marilyn Maye, American singer and actress.
 13 – Teddy Charles, American vibraphonist, pianist, and drummer (died 2012).
 14
 Egil Monn-Iversen, composer and pianist (died 2017).
 Norman Amadio, Canadian pianist and composer (died 2020).
 18 – Ken Colyer, English trumpeter and cornetist (died 1988).
 22 – Tommy Turrentine, American trumpeter (died 1997).
 23 – Mike Daniels, British trumpeter and bandleader (died 2016).
 24 – Johnny Griffin, American jazz saxophonist (heart attack) (died 2008).
 25 – Rick Henderson, American saxophonist (died 2004).
 26 – Herman Foster, American pianist (died 1999).
 29 – Errol Buddle, Australian bassoonist and saxophonist (died 2018).

 May
 4
 Lars Gullin, Swedish saxophonist (died 1976).
 Maynard Ferguson, Canadian jazz trumpeter and bandleader (died 2006).
 15 – Joe Gordon, American trumpeter (died 1963).
 22 – Jackie Cain, American singer (died 2014).
 24 – Max Bennett, American bassist, L.A. Express, The Wrecking Crew (died 2018).
 26 – Jack Kevorkian, American musician and composer (died 2011).
 29 – Freddie Redd, American pianist and composer (died 2021).
 30 – Priscilla Bowman, American singer (died 1988).

 June
 1 – Frank Parr, English trombonist and cricketer (died 2012).
 4 – Teddy Kotick, American bassist (died 1986).
 11 – Bob Gordon, American saxophonist (died 1955).
 12 – Vic Damone, American singer, songwriter, and actor (died 2018).
 20 – Eric Dolphy, American alto saxophonist, flutist, and bass clarinetist (died 1964).
 23 – Bob Badgley, American upright bassist (died 2012).
 26 – Don Lanphere, American saxophonist (died 2003).

 July
 2 – Richard Wyands, American pianist, composer, and arranger.
 4 – Ted Joans, American trumpeter and jazz poet (died 2003).
 13 – Leroy Vinnegar, American upright bassist (died 1999).
 15 – Joe Harriott, Jamaican saxophonist and composer (died 1973).
 17
 Joe Morello, American drummer (died 2011).
 Vince Guaraldi, American pianist (died 1976).
 18 – Carl Fontana, American trombonist (died 2003).
 20 – Peter Ind, British upright bassist and record producer.
 22 – Keter Betts, American upright bassist (died 2005).
 29 – Konstantin Orbelyan, Armenian pianist, composer, and head of the State Estrada Orchestra of Armenia (died 2014).
 30 – Vernel Fournier, American drummer (died 2000).

 August 
 3 – Lyn Christie, Australian-born American-based bassist (died 2020).
 8 – Don Burrows, Australian clarinetist, saxophonist and flautist (died 2020).
 15 – Bobby Orr, Scottish drummer (died 2020).
 16 – Carl Perkins, American pianist (died 1958).
 21
 Addison Farmer, American bassist (died 1963).
 Art Farmer, American trumpeter (died 1999).
 23 – Gil Coggins, American pianist (died 2004).
 26 – Peter Appleyard, British–Canadian vibraphonist and percussionist (died 2016). 
 28 – Kenny Drew, American pianist (died 1993).

 September
 1 – Ed Summerlin, American composer, arranger, saxophonist, and music educator (died 2006).
 2 – Horace Silver, American pianist and composer (died 2014).
 5
 Albert Mangelsdorff, German trombonist (died 2005).
 Hal Stein, American saxophonist (died 2008).
 11 – Lorraine Geller, American pianist (died 1958).
 14 – Jay Cameron, American saxophonist (died 2001).
 15 – Cannonball Adderley, American saxophonist (died 1975).
 20 – Vi Redd, American alto saxophonist and singer.
 21 – William Russo, American trombonist, composer, and arranger (died 2003).
 23
 Frank Foster, American saxophonist and flautist (died 2011).
 Michel Gaudry, French upright bassist.
 28 – Koko Taylor, American singer (died 2009).
 30 – Jon Eardley, American trumpeter (died 1991).

 October
 10 – Junior Mance, American pianist and composer (died 2021).
 22 – Clare Fischer, American keyboardist (died 2012).
 28 – Ronaldo Bôscoli, Brazilian composer (died 1994).
 30 – Bobby Jones, American saxophonist (died 1980).

 November
 2 – Herb Geller, American saxophonist (died 2013).
 4 – Larry Bunker, American drummer and vibraphonist (died 2005).
 11 – Ernestine Anderson, American singer (died 2016).
 12 – Audrey Morris, American singer and pianist (died 2018).
 13
 Ernie Farrow, American pianist and multi-instrumentalist (died 1969).
 Hampton Hawes, American pianist (died 1977).
 15 – Seldon Powell, American saxophonist and flautist (died 1997).
 17
 Chuck Andrus, American upright bassist (died 1997).
 John Sangster, Australian composer, arranger, drummer, cornettist, and vibraphonist (died 1995).
 18 – Sheila Jordan, American singer and songwriter.
 22 – John Brimhall, American pianist and musical arranger (died 2003).
 25 – Etta Jones, American singer (died 2001).

 December
 4 – Frank Tiberi, American saxophonist.
 5 – Gene Allen, American jazz reedist (died 2008).
 6
 Alan Abel, American percussionist (died 2020).
 Frankie Dunlop, American drummer (died 2014).
 8 – Jimmy Smith, American Hammond organist (died 2005).
 18 – Harold Land, American saxophonist (died 2001).
 24 – Jimmy Campbell, American drummer (died 1998).
 28 – Moe Koffman, Canadian saxophonist and flautist (died 2001).
 30 – Jack Montrose, American saxophonist (died 2006).
 31 – Jerry van Rooyen, Dutch trumpeter, conductor, and composer (died 2009).

References

Bibliography

External links
 History Of Jazz Timeline: 1928 at All About Jazz

Jazz, 1928 In
Jazz by year